Huddleston Branch is a stream in Oregon County, in the Ozarks of southern Missouri. It is a tributary to Dry Creek.

The stream headwaters are at  approximately two miles northwest of Alton. The stream flows to the northwest passing under U.S. Route 160 and enters Dry Creek about one-half mile northeast of Royal Oak.

Huddleston Branch has the name of John Huddleston, a pioneer citizen.

See also
List of rivers of Missouri

References

Rivers of Oregon County, Missouri
Rivers of Missouri